The following is a list of the television networks and announcers who have broadcast college football's Alamo Bowl throughout the years.

Television

2020s

2010s

2000s

1990s

Radio

2020s

2010s

2000s

References

Alamo
Broadcasters
Alamo Bowl
Alamo Bowl
Alamo Bowl broadcasters